Frost is an unincorporated community in Livingston Parish, Louisiana, United States.

History
A post office called Frost was established in 1919, and remained in operation until 1954. The community has the name of the Frost family, original owners of the town site.

References

Unincorporated communities in Livingston Parish, Louisiana
Unincorporated communities in Louisiana